The Calgary Mountaineers are a box lacrosse organization based out of Calgary, Alberta, Canada.  The organization represents teams at three levels of the Rocky Mountain Lacrosse League: a Senior B squad, along with a Junior A team and a Junior B team.

History
The Junior B Mountaineers were created in the late 1990s, and have won the Alberta Provincial Championship in 2000, 2004, 2007, 2008, 2009, 2010, 2011, 2012 and 2013.

In the 2009 season, the Mounties finished the regular season first overall in Alberta with a nearly unfettered record of 19–1.
On August 22, 2009, the Junior B Mountaineers doing what only two non-Ontarian teams have done before upset the OLA Junior B Lacrosse League's Clarington Green Gaels 8–4 to win Alberta's first Founders Cup since 1999,   finishing the season with an overall record of 29–3.

Founders Cup
CANADIAN NATIONAL CHAMPIONSHIPS

External links
 A closer look at the 2009 Founders Cup champion Calgary Mountaineers

Mou
Lacrosse teams in Alberta
Sports clubs established in the 1990s
1990s establishments in Alberta